

Denmark
Danish West Indies – Peter Carl Frederik von Scholten, Governor-General of the Danish West Indies (1827–1848) 
Iceland – Torkild Abraham Hoppe, Governor of Iceland (1841–1847)
North Greenland –
Nicolai Zimmer, Inspector of North Greenland (1845–1846)
Christian Søren Marcus Olrik, Inspector of North Greenland (1846–1866)
South Greenland – Carl Peter Holbøll, Inspector of South Greenland (1828–1856)

France
 Algeria – Thomas Robert Bugeaud, Governor-General of Algeria (1841–1847)
French Guiana –
Jean Baptiste Armand Bertrand Cadéot, Governor of French Guiana (1845–1846)
André Aimé Pariset, Governor of French Guiana (1846–1850)
Guadeloupe – Jean-François Layrle, Governor of Guadeloupe (1845–1848)
Martinique – Pierre Louis Aimé Mathieu, Governor of Martinique (1844–1848)
 Oceania – Armand Joseph Bruat, Governor of the Colony of Oceania (1843–1847)

The Netherlands
Dutch West Indies – Reinier Frederik Baron van Raders, Governor-General of the Dutch West Indies (1845–1852)
Surinam
Netherlands Antilles

Portugal
Angola – Pedro Alexandrino da Cunha, Governor-General of Angola (1845–1848)

Spain
Cuba – Leopoldo O'Donnell, Governor of Cuba (1843–1848)
Puerto Rico – Lt. Gen. Rafael De Aristegui y Velez, Governor of Puerto Rico (1844–1847)

United Kingdom
The Bahamas – George Benvenuto Matthew, Governor of the Bahamas (1844–1849)
Bermuda – 
Lt. Col. William Reid, Governor of Bermuda (1839–1846)
William Nelson Hutchinson, Governor of Bermuda (1846)
Sir Charles Elliott, Governor of Bermuda (1846–1852)
British Columbia – James Douglas, Governor of British Columbia (1845–1850)
British Guiana – Henry Light, Governor of British Guiana (1838–1848)
Canada – The Earl Charles Cathcart, Governor General of the Province of Canada (1846–1847)
Jamaica (with Belize) – 
The Earl James Bruce, Governor of Jamaica (1842–1846)
George Henry Frederick Berkeley, Acting Governor of Jamaica (1846–1847)
Leeward Islands (Antigua, British Virgin Islands, Dominica, Montserrat, Saint Christopher-Nevis-Anguilla) – Sir Charles Augustus Fitzroy, Governor of the Leeward Islands (1842–1846)
Malta Colony – Patrick Stuart, Governor of Malta (1843–1847)
New Brunswick – Sir William MacBean George Colebrooke, Lieutenant-Governor of New Brunswick (1841–1848)
New South Wales
 Major George Gipps, Governor of New South Wales (1838–1846)
 Lieutenant Colonel Charles FitzRoy, Governor of New South Wales (1846–1855)
Newfoundland – 
Sir John Harvey, Governor of Newfoundland and Labrador (1841–1846)
Robert Law, Colonial Administrator (1846–1847)
Nova Scotia – 
Viscount Lucius Bentinck Cary, Governor of Nova Scotia (1840–1846)
Sir Jeremiah Dickson, Governor of Nova Scotia (1846)
Sir John Harvey, Governor of Nova Scotia (1846–1852)
Prince Edward Island – Sir Henry Vere Huntley, Governor of Prince Edward Island (1841–1847)
Rupert's Land – Sir John Henry Pelly, Governor of the Hudson's Bay Company (1822–1852)
Assiniboia – 
Alexander Christie, Governor of Assiniboia (1833–1839, 1844–1846)
John Crofton, Governor of Assiniboia (1846–1847)
South Australia – Lieutenant-Colonel Frederick Holt Robe, Governor of South Australia (1845–1848)
Trinidad – 
Henry George Macleod, Governor of Trinidad (1840–1846)
Baron George Francis Robert Harris, Governor of Trinidad (1846–1854)
Windward Islands (Barbados, Grenada, St. Lucia, St. Vincent, Tobago) – 
Sir Charles Edward Grey, Governor of the Windward Islands (1841–1846)
William Reid, Governor of the Windward Islands (1846–1848)
Western Australia
 John Hutt, Governor of Western Australia (1839–1846)
 Lieutenant-Colonel Andrew Clarke, Governor of Western Australia (1846–1847)

Colonial governors
Colonial governors
1846